Ansar Rural District is in the Central District of Takab County, West Azerbaijan province, Iran. At the National Census of 2006, its population was 5,846 in 1,155 households. There were 4,918 inhabitants in 1,299 households at the following census of 2011. At the most recent census of 2016, the population of the rural district was 4,242 in 1,259 households. The largest of its 20 villages was Dur Bash, with 729 people.

References 

Takab County

Rural Districts of West Azerbaijan Province

Populated places in West Azerbaijan Province

Populated places in Takab County